The 2023 Vietnamese Cup football tournament is the 31st season of the National Cup football tournament, scheduled to start on April 1, 2023, and end on August 31, 2023.

Background 
This is also the last year the tournament uses the traditional year-round format. The tournament consists of 14 clubs of V.League 1 and 11 teams of V.League 2 to compete. The winning club of the tournament will play the Vietnamese Super Cup 2024 match.Hanoi FC is the defending champion after they won the 2022 Vietnamese Cup.

Access

Matches

Qualifying round

Round of 16

Quarter-final

Semi-final

Final

Bracket

(1):Currently play in the V.League 1(2):Currently play in the V.League 2

Football in Vietnam
Football